The 3rd Frigate Squadron  also known as the Third Frigate Squadron was a naval formation of the Royal Navy from February 1949 to 1963 and again from 1972 to May 1980.

The 3rd Frigate Squadron was formed in February 1949 and was assigned to the East Indies Fleet later Far East Fleet until February 1964 when it was re-designated the 26th Escort Squadron. It was reformed in 1972 when it was allocated to the 1st Flotilla it was administered by Flag Officer, 1st Flotilla until the appointment of a Captain (F) in December 1973 it remained with the 1st flotilla until April 1976. It then transferred to the 2nd Flotilla until May 1980 when it was disbanded.

Captains (F), 3rd Frigate Squadron
 Post holders included:

References

 Mackie, Colin. "Royal Navy Senior Appointments from 1865" (PDF). gulabin.com. C. Mackie, July 2018.
 Watson, Dr Graham. "Royal Navy Organisation and Ship Deployment 1947–2013". naval-history.net. G. Smith.

Frigate squadrons of the Royal Navy
Military units and formations established in 1949
Military units and formations disestablished in 1980